Peter Simple may mean:

Peter Simple (novel), an 1834 seafaring novel by Marryat
Peter Simple (horse), a racehorse that won the Grand National twice
 Peter Simple, pseudonym of and newspaper column by the British journalist Michael Wharton